Hogan's Heroes is an American television sitcom co-created by Bernard Fein and Albert S. Ruddy. The show is set during World War II, and concerns a group of Allied prisoners of war who use a German POW camp as a base of operations for sabotage and espionage purposes directed against Nazi Germany. It ran for six seasons, with 168 half-hour episodes being produced in total. The show premiered on CBS on September 17, 1965, and ran until April 4, 1971. The pilot episode was filmed in black-and-white, but the entire ensuing series was filmed in color.

Background 
From the beginning the show’s producers decided that Stalag 13 would always have a snowy winter. Beyond recreating an extreme or adverse setting, this was to prevent problems with continuity and to allow the episodes to be shown in any order. 

Like most sitcoms of its time, Hogan’s Heroes was not serialized, so the episodes generally have no relation to each other, except for two composed of two parts: "A Tiger Hunt in Paris" (1966) and "Lady Chitterly's Lover" (1970).

Series overview

Episodes

Pilot episode
The pilot episode, "The Informer", filmed in early 1965, aired on September 17 that year. The episode's plot centered on two new prisoners entering Stalag 13 (in this episode, referred to as Camp 13), Lieutenant Carter (played by Hovis), who escapes into the camp, and Wagner (played by Noam Pitlik), who is actually a German spy posing as an Allied prisoner. Wagner attempts to expose Hogan's operation to General Burkhalter (here known as Colonel Burkhalter), but Hogan and his men are able to discredit the spy. As punishment for his outlandish claims, the spy is sent to the Russian front.

Although the series remained true to the pilot in most respects, there were some changes. Some of the prisoners' luxuries, such as an underground steam room, were eliminated to make the situation marginally more plausible. The character of Colonel Klink was made more of a fool than a villain, while his sharp accent was toned down.  Klink's walk had less of the distinctive stoop. He also does not carry the riding crop he often affected during prisoner roll calls in other episodes.

The major difference was that only the pilot was shot in black-and-white. After the series was sold to CBS, the network announced a major push in color programming for the 1965–66 season, and so the rest of the season (and the series) was filmed in color.

The character of Vladimir Minsk, a Soviet POW played by Leonid Kinskey, was intended to be a series regular. However, Kinskey declined to continue with the series. Stewart Moss, who played an American POW named Olson in the pilot, also declined an offer to become a series regular. Larry Hovis was intended to be a guest star in the pilot only. However, producer Ed Feldman was impressed by his performance and, after Kinskey and Moss declined to take part in the series, was offered a regular role. Hovis's character was changed from a lieutenant to a sergeant. According to Hovis, Feldman chose to do this because "sergeants are more sympathetic." Although Hovis's character had escaped at the end of the pilot, Feldman did not see this as a problem because he believed "no one will care".

Season 1 (1965–66)

Season 2 (1966–67)

Season 3 (1967–68)

Season 4 (1968–69)

Season 5 (1969–70)

Season 6 (1970–71)

Home releases
The following DVD sets were released by CBS Home Entertainment.

References

External links

Hogan's Heroes Episode Guide at TV Gems
Hogan's Heroes at The Classic TV Archive

Lists of American sitcom episodes